Paul G. Comba (1926 – April 5, 2017) was an Italian-American computer scientist, an amateur astronomer and a prolific discoverer of minor planets.

He was born in Tunisia to Italian parents in 1926, and moved to Italy at a young age.  Admitted to university studies at the age of 17, He attended the University of Turin (1943–46). In 1946 he moved to the United States to attend Bluffton College, from which he graduated in 1947.  He then attended Caltech, and completed his Ph.D. work in mathematics in 1951 (the degree was conferred at commencement in 1952). In 1951 he moved to Honolulu where he taught at the University of Hawaii until 1960.

He then joined IBM as a software developer, and later as a member of the IBM Cambridge Scientific Center. There he worked in Cryptography, and also developed a multiplication algorithm for large numbers, which reduces the multiplication time to as little as 3% of the conventional algorithm.

In 2003 he won the Leslie C. Peltier Award for his contribution to astronomy.

He is the author of the Astronomical League's Asteroid Club Observing Guide, and was an active member of the Prescott Astronomy Club.

Prescott Observatory

After retirement in 1991, Comba moved to Prescott, Arizona, where he built the Prescott Observatory (obs. code: 684)  There he specialized in discovering asteroids and has been recognized for the discovery of 644 numbered objects as of September 2013.

Refurbished in 2011, the observatory houses a PlaneWave CDK 24 inch telescope with two Takahashi wide field refractors in the dome. There is a dedicated solar observatory that is equipped with a Lunt 152 solar telescope. The observatory also has a nano lab for cosmology research that is currently equipped with a JEOL 5800LV SEM (scanning electron microscope). Prescott Observatory is an active contributor for the webcast organization SLOOH which is the premiere webcast organization for live celestial events. The observatory is now owned and operated by Matt Francis.

List of discovered minor planets

References 
 

1926 births
2017 deaths
20th-century American astronomers
21st-century American astronomers
Discoverers of asteroids

Italian emigrants to the United States